Waltz, as a surname, may refer to:

People:
 Christoph Waltz (born 1956), Academy Award-winning Austrian-German actor
 David Waltz (1943–2012), American computer scientist and professor
 Gustavus Waltz, (fl. 1732-1759) English opera singer
 Ian Waltz (born 1977), American discus thrower
 Jacob Waltz, the "Dutchman" (actually a German immigrant) of the Lost Dutchman's Gold Mine legend
 John Waltz (baseball) (1860-1931), American baseball manager (for eight games) and executive
 Kenneth Waltz (1924-2013), American professor and scholar of international relations
 Michael Waltz (born 1974), American politician
 Marilyn Waltz (1931-2006), Playboy Playmate of the Month for February (as Margaret Scott) and April 1954 and April 1955
 Patrick Waltz (1924-1972), American film and television actor
 Sasha Waltz (born 1963), German choreographer, dancer and leader of the dance company Sasha Waltz and Guests
 Susan Waltz, American political scientist

Fictional characters:
 Count Waltz, the main antagonist in the video game Eternal Sonata

See also
 Hanna Gronkiewicz-Waltz, Polish politician
 Walz, a surname